Victor Aaron Ramirez (September 11, 1956 – September 4, 1996) was an American actor of Yaqui descent. He was the original voice of John Redcorn on King of the Hill, which was taken over by Jonathan Joss in the show's second season following Aaron's death.

Early life
Victor Aaron Ramirez was born on September 11, 1956, in Odessa, Texas. His parents were of Yaqui ancestry. Growing up, Aaron grew up in a mobile home with his brothers and sisters in a poor family. After graduating from high school in Austin, Aaron got married and worked for a casino. Afterward, he moved to California and became an actor.

Personal life
In 1984 Aaron divorced Eduvina with whom he had two daughters.

Victor was the grandson of the famous West Texas bootmaker, Jose Ramirez.

Death
Aaron died in a car accident on September 4, 1996, at the age of 39, seven days before his 40th birthday, when his car was struck at an intersection by a truck that ran the red light. The King of the Hill episode "The Order of the Straight Arrow" is dedicated to his memory.

Filmography

Film

Television

References

External links

Victor Aaron at Friend777

American people of Yaqui descent
Hispanic and Latino American male actors
American male actors of Mexican descent
American male voice actors
American male television actors
American male film actors
Road incident deaths in California
1956 births
1996 deaths
20th-century American male actors